The Albanian Training and Doctrine Command (TRADOC) is a research-oriented formation in the Albanian Armed Forces. It is headquartered at Tirana, Albania. TRADOC is charged with overseeing training evaluation and reforms; weapon, equipment and force modernization; development of concepts and doctrine revision.

TRADOC was established on 5 September 2001.

Mission 
The TRADOC performs the management and monitoring of the Standardization Agreement (STANAG) processes of the Land Force, Navy and  Air Force, which is the main instrument through which Albanian Armed Forces (AAF) can be integrated and modernized according to the criteria of the North Atlantic Treaty Organization (NATO) alliance. Also, an integral part of the work of the TRADOC institution is the monitoring of the academic achievement issued in the Armed Forces; education and training of Sub-officers at all levels of the AAF and of the middle-class civil defense staff, unified with the Sub-officers functions and to develop their career into the Armed Forces; development, coordination, and provision of individual training management capabilities throughout the career cycle, as well as the certification of skills training to all members of the AAF; preparation of staff at all levels to achieve through constructive simulation, providing premises and polygonal capacity for collective preparation of all types of troops through realistic exercises on the ground and operational evaluation of staff, units and subunits; support Ministry of Defence, Albanian Armed Forces and their subordinate structures with information on books, doctrines, manuals, regulations, periodicals, promotional materials, as well as in electronic form; implementation of program policies and procedures of education, training and testing in foreign languages of the personnel; education and training of officer candidates running for commanding departments or sub-units; education and qualification of staff officers and senior commanders, military and civilian, of the AAF and other security institutions as well as advanced security and defense studies through institutional courses, such as, Advanced Officer Course (KAO), Basic Course of Staff Officer (KBOSH), Course of the General Staff Officer (KOSHP), Senior Officer Course (KLO), Advanced Course of Defense and Security (KLSM).

Structure 

The Training and Doctrine Command consists on: 

  Training and Doctrine Command, in Tirana
 Armed Forces Academy, in Tirana
 NCOs Academy, in Tirana
 Troops School, in Vlorë
 Simulation Centre, in Tirana
 Doctrine and Research Centre, in Tirana

Courses patches and insignia 
Patches, badges and shoulder sleeve insignia of the institutional courses wearing by Albanian military officers on their uniforms:

See also 
 Albanian Armed Forces
 Albanian Land Force
 Albanian Naval Force
 Albanian Air Force

References

External links
 (Official website)

Military units and formations of Albania
Military education and training in Albania